St Bede's Catholic High School is a coeducational secondary school located in the Lytham area of Lytham St Annes in the English county of Lancashire.

Established in 1961, it is a voluntary aided school administered by Lancashire County Council and the Roman Catholic Diocese of Lancaster. The school offers GCSEs as programmes of study for pupils, and offers The Duke of Edinburgh's Award as a extra-curricular activity. St Bede's was also previously awarded specialist status as a Business and Enterprise College.

Notable former pupils
Joe Cardle, footballer
Scott Cardle, boxer
Jeff Thomas, boxer
Stephen Tompkinson, actor
Joe Riley, footballer

References

External links
St Bede's Catholic High School official website

Secondary schools in Lancashire
Schools in the Borough of Fylde
Catholic secondary schools in the Diocese of Lancaster
Voluntary aided schools in England